Edgar Quinet is a station on Line 6 of the Paris Métro. Located at the intersection of Boulevard Edgar Quinet, the Rue du Montparnasse and Rue de la Gaîté, it is situated in the 14th arrondissement.

Location

The metro station is located under Boulevard Edgar Quinet, east of the intersection with the streets of La Gaîté, d'Odessa, du Montparnasse and Delambre. Orientated approximately along an east-west axis, it is placed between the Montparnasse – Bienvenue and Raspail Metro stations.

History
The station opened as part of the former Line 2 South on 24 April 1906, when it was extended from Passy to Place d'Italie. On 14 October 1907, Line 2 South was incorporated into Line 5. It was incorporated into Line 6 on 12 October 1942.

It is named after Boulevard Edgar Quinet, itself named after Edgar Quinet (1803–1875), a historian and intellectual who wrote on German history, Christianity and other subjects. The station was the location of the Barrière Montparnasse (known as the Barrière d'Arcueil during the French Revolution), a gate built for the collection of taxation as part of the Wall of the Farmers-General; the gate was built between 1784 and 1788 and demolished in the nineteenth century.

In 2018, 2,364,420 travellers entered the station, placing it at the 232nd position out of 302 Métro stations in terms of use.

Passenger services

Access
The station has a single access called Boulevard Edgar-Quine, leading to the median-strip of that boulevard, right of the no. 11 facing the crossroads. Consisting of a fixed staircase, it is adorned with an Adolphe Dervaux candelabra.

Station layout

Platforms
Edgar Quinet is a standard configuration station. It has two platforms separated by metro tracks and the roof is elliptical. The decor is the style used for the majority of Métro stations. The lighting strips are white and rounded in the Gaudin style of the Metro revival of the 2000s; the bevelled white ceramic tiles cover the walls, tympans and corridors outlets. The roof is painted white. Advertising frames are metallic and the name of the station is written in a Parisine font on enamelled plates. The Motte style seats are red.

Bus connections
The station does not have a connection with the RATP Bus Network.

Places of interest
Nearby are the districts of Montparnasse and Montparnasse Cemetery.

References

Paris Métro stations in the 14th arrondissement of Paris
Railway stations in France opened in 1906